C-flat may refer to:

 The musical pitch C♭
 C-flat major, a major scale based on C♭
 C-flat minor, a minor scale based on C♭